Mohabbat Daagh Ki Soorat is a 2021 Pakistani television series, directed by Zeeshan Ahmed and written by Saira Raza It is produced by Abdullah Kadwani and Asad Qureshi under their banner 7th Sky Entertainment. It premiered in August 2021 on Geo TV. It stars Neelam Muneer, Sami Khan and Syed Jibran in the leading roles.

Plot
A young passionate girl, Shijrat loses her father in an accident which forces her and her mother to move in to her Uncle's house. Afaaq, the hot headed breadwinner, protests against them living there. Shijrat witnesses the abuse Afaaq sprays at his wife Saba for not having a child. When Shijrat goes to college, she meets Sinan, who has become a cripple due to an accident, but is cheerful about it. Afaaq discovers he cannot become a father and screams at Saba and Shijrat becoming self conscious. Sinaan and Shijrat fall in love and Sinaan sends his mother to ask for Shijrat's hand in marriage. Shijrat and Sinaan get their nikkah done, but their ruksati lingers on due to Shijrat's request of getting married after finishing her CSS. Sinaan's classmate taunts him about how he got such a wonderful girl while being a cripple. Sinaan, in a fit of rage decides to undergo a surgery on his leg so he can walk again. The operation is successful. Later on, Sinaan takes Shijrat out one night, and shows her the house where they will live after ruksati. They accidentally consummate their marriage and 4 months later Shijrat discovers that she is pregnant.

Cast

Main Cast
Neelam Muneer as Shijrat Ud Dur; Sannan Wife
Sami Khan as Sannan Ilyas; Shijrat Husband 
Syed Jibran as Afaq; Saba Husband

Recurring Cast
Sunita Marshall as Saba; Afaq's wife
Asma Abbas as Sinnan's and Sumaiyya mother Shirjhat mother in law and Zain Grandmother 
Kinza Malik as Mohsina; Shijrat's mother and Sannan mother in law Zain Grandmother 
Azra Mohyeddin as Shaista, Afaq's mother
Rashid Farooqui as Afaq's father and Mohsina's brother
Erum Akhtar as Sumaiyya, Sannan's sister
Sukaina Khan as Narmeen, Sannan's ex fiance
Kamran Jeelani as Ubaid, Sumaiyya's husband and Narmeen's uncle
Fazila Qazi as Narmeen's mother and Ubaid's sister
Ellie Zaid as Maazia, Afaq's sister
Humaira Bano as Khalida, Maazia's mother in law
Arez Ahmed as Khalid, Maazia's husband
Tipu Shareef as Affan, Sannan's brother
Fahim Tejani as Parvez; Afaq's colleague and friend
Sami Khan as Shahbaz, Afaq's brother
Zuhab Khan as Shahbaz, grown-up Shahbaz
Rushna Khanzada as Ubaid's sister in law
Khushi Maheen as Ghazia, Afaq's youngest sister
Rimha Ahmed as Ghazia grown-up Ghazia
Ikram Abbasi as Jamshed, Ubaid's younger brother
Naveed Raza as Faraz, Narmeen's husband
Birjees Farooqui as Rabab's mother, Sinnan's friend
Ayyan Ahmed
Hamza Mohsin

Guest Appearances
Mohsin Gilani as Rahim; Shijrat's father (flashback only), died in accident
Tariq Jameel as Maulana Sahib
Danial Afzal Khan as Bilal Yazdani
Sajid Shah as Narmeen's father
Muhammad Hanif
Majida Hameed as Saba's sister

Development

Casting
Neelam Muneer and Sami Khan were selected to portray the main leads. Muneer previously appeared in commercial hits Kahin Deep Jaley and Qayamat, was selected to portray Shijrat.  Khan previously appeared in Mohlat, was finalised for the male lead of Sannan. It marked their third on-screen collaboration as a couple after Tere Bina and feature film Wrong No. 2. Syed Jibran was selected to portray antagonist previously appeared in channel's Mere Mohsin, Aik Thi Rania, Noor-e-Zindagi, Tum Se Hi Talluq Hai and Koi Deepak Ho. Sunita Marshall also cast in channel's fellow series Khuda Aur Muhabbat (season 3) was selected to portray Saba, made her second appearance as a couple with Jibran after Qaid-e-Tanhai. Besides these Asma Abbas, Sukaina Khan, Erum Akhtar and  Sabeena Farooq were also cast in supporting roles.

Release
The teasers of the serial were released in August 2021, prior to its television premier. On 20 August 2021, it was revealed to air from 25 August on Wednesdays at 8:00 PM PST. However, after Fitoor ends, channel started airing the show twice a week, Wednesday and Thursday, on primetime.

Reception
Mohabbat Daagh Ki Soorat was in news even before its release due to its star studded cast and intense teasers. However,after its release, it received negative reviews from the audience due to unclarity in the script. The drama received backlash from the audience when "Shijrat" (main lead) revealed to be four months pregnant before her rukhsati. The serial did lead the Trp chart at its respective time slot quite a few times.Arez received praise from audience for his portrayal of negative character as Khalid.

Ratings
The serial managed to grab viewer's attention in its initial episodes, received good rating and lead on it time slot as well. However, later episodes failed to impress the viewers due to its dragged story and was overtaken by HUM TV's Dobara and ARY Digital's Berukhi on ratings chart. The following episodes of the serial emerged as leader on the primetime slot;

Controversy
A man named "Gul" opened fire during the shooting of drama serial "Mohabbat Daagh Ki Soorat". On inquiry, it was revealed that he  opened fire following a dispute with the producers of the serial. However, Gul was arrested shortly after the incident. Nine crew members of 7th Sky Production sustained injuries during the incident.

References

External links

Pakistani television series
Pakistani television dramas based on novels
Geo TV original programming
2021 Pakistani television series debuts
2022 Pakistani television series endings